Melas may refer to:

 Plural of mela

People
 Melas (mythology), a number of different characters in Greek mythology
 Pavlos Melas (1870–1904), a Hellenic Army officer and a symbol of the Greek Struggle for Macedonia
 Chloe Melas, an American journalist 
 Leon Melas (1812–1879), a Greek politician
 Michael von Melas, a field marshal for the Austrian Empire during the Napoleonic Wars
 Mihail Melas (1833–1897), a Greek politician and merchant
 Vasileios Melas (1879–1956), an officer of the Hellenic army, brother of Pavlos Melas
 Zafeiris Melas (born 1957), a Greek pop-folk singer

Places
 Melas, Kastoria, a village in Western Macedonia, Greece, formerly Statitsa, renamed for Pavlos Melas 
 Pavlos Melas (municipality), in Thessaloniki, Central Macedonia, Greece
 Melas (Naxos), a town in ancient Greece
 Melas, now Manavgat River, in Turkey
 Melas Chasma, a canyon on Mars
 Gulf of Melas, the previous name of Gulf of Saros, in Turkey

Other uses
 MELAS syndrome, one of the family of mitochondrial cytopathies

See also

 Mela (disambiguation)